Vaiki Odunna Vandi is a 1987 Indian Malayalam film, directed and produced by P. K. Radhakrishnan. The film stars Nalini in the lead role. The film has musical score by Raveendran.

Cast
Nalini

Soundtrack
The music was composed by Raveendran and the lyrics were written by Ezhacheri Ramachandran.

References

External links
 

1987 films
1980s Malayalam-language films